Yevgeny Aleksandrovich Kafelnikov (born 18 February 1974) is a Russian former world No. 1 tennis player. He won two Grand Slam singles titles, the 1996 French Open and the 1999 Australian Open, and a gold medal at the 2000 Sydney Olympics. He also won four Grand Slam doubles titles, and is the most recent man to have won both the men's singles and doubles titles at the same Grand Slam tournament (which he accomplished at the 1996 French Open). In 2019, Kafelnikov was inducted into the International Tennis Hall of Fame.

Career
In his breakthrough year in 1994, Kafelnikov won three titles, reached the Hamburg Masters final and beat world top-5 players on six occasions. His ranking rose from 102 at the beginning of the year, to a year-end ranking of 11.

In 1995, he reached his first Grand Slam semifinals, beating world no. 1 Andre Agassi in straight sets in the quarterfinals. He also defeated three top-10 players (Michael Stich, Goran Ivanisevic and Boris Becker) on his way to the title in Milan.

At the 1996 French Open, Kafelnikov became the first Russian to ever win a Grand Slam title, defeating Michael Stich in the final in straight sets, having beaten world no. 1 Pete Sampras in the semifinals.

Kafelnikov was finalist at the 1997 ATP Tour World Championships, and won three titles during that season. In doubles, he won both the French Open and US Open partnering Daniel Vacek.

At the 1999 Australian Open, 10th seed Kafelnikov won his second singles Grand Slam title, defeating Thomas Enqvist in the final in four sets. He also won in Rotterdam and Moscow, was runner-up at the Canadian Open and reached the semifinals of the US Open.

Seeded fifth, Kafelnikov won the gold medal in the men's singles tournament at the 2000 Olympic Games, beating second seed Gustavo Kuerten in the quarterfinals and Tommy Haas in the final in five sets. He also reached the final of the Australian Open and the quarterfinals of the French Open.

In 2001, he defeated world no. 1 Gustavo Kuerten in the quarterfinals of the US Open for the loss of just seven games, before losing to Lleyton Hewitt in the semifinals. Kafelnikov was also a finalist at the Paris Masters, quarterfinalist at the Australian Open and French Open, and won a record fifth consecutive title in Moscow.

Kafelnikov won his fourth and final doubles Grand Slam at the French Open in 2002, partnering Paul Haarhuis, and his final career singles title, in Tashkent. He was also a member of Russia's Davis Cup-winning team in 2002.

Kafelnikov played his last ATP-tour match in October 2003 (in St Petersburg). In total, he won 53 titles across singles and doubles during his career, and he remains the last male player to win both singles and doubles titles at the same Grand Slam.

Post-retirement
Since retiring from tennis, Kafelnikov cashed three times at the 2005 World Series of Poker. He also played golf on the European Tour at the 2005, 2008, 2013, 2014 and 2015 Russian Open, 2012, 2013 and 2014 Austrian Open, and the 2014 Czech Masters, plus several Challenge Tour events, without making any cuts. During the 2008 Miami Masters, Kafelnikov coached Marat Safin (in the absence of Safin's usual coach, Hernán Gumy). In 2009 and 2010, he participated in the ATP Champions Tour (for retired ATP-professional tennis players), finishing in third place in tournaments in Chengdu, Bogota and São Paulo.

Kafelnikov was inducted into the International Tennis Hall of Fame in 2019, not counting enough votes in his previous nominations in 2012 (compared to Gustavo Kuerten and Jennifer Capriati), in 2015 (compared to David Hall and Amélie Mauresmo), and in 2018 (compared to Michael Stich and Helena Suková). In May 2017, Kafelnikov was extensively interviewed by the most popular Russian website Sports.ru considering his current political preferences. In August 2020, Kafelnikov announced his plans to settle in [Western / old] Europe.

In March 2021, Kafelnikov faced another wave of rumors about his retirement in 2003 as really being caused by ATP's desire to avoid a betting scandal considering his match in Lyon against Fernando Vicente. Russian volleyball player Aleksey Spiridonov said in an interview: "Kafelnikov is corrupt. He made bets against himself during his career. And then he finished abruptly when being grabbed by the ass. I know. My friends work in the offices. And someone in an interview also said that Kafelnikov offered him to bet against himself and lose the match. Who pinned him down? There was no [powerful] tennis federation back then. I think, the gangsters". One week after his match in 2003, Kafelnikov said about the accusations: "This is a complete bullshit, but now in the locker room, they [players] look at me like at an enemy of the people. Even in my country where I have always been a role model they [people] have begun to look at me that way. I talked to Fernando and he said his mother was crying on the phone because of this. Those who made this mess should be punished. The article says Kafelnikov has been involved in match-fixing and it rips me to pieces. I do not want to be associated with betting in any way".

To a lesser extent, the player has been commemorated for his outspoken jealousy towards the much more impressive incomes of golf players in general, if compared to his colleagues in tennis. Lindsay Davenport correspondingly voiced some support for Kafelnikov's claim who was also worried "it would be a shame to see the public lose sympathy in me just because I am making such a statement". In January 2001, during the 2001 Australian Open, he concluded: "If you look at the golfers, we are taking an extreme example now, of course, the golfers make $540,000 a week to the winner. And this is the lowest tournament that they have on the U.S. Tour. If you look at the tennis players, to win a tournament, win five matches [at the] absolutely lowest level tournament you make only $42,000. I think it is quite bizarre to see that kind of money in a tennis game."

Major finals

Grand Slam tournaments

Singles: 3 (2–1)

Doubles: 5 (4–1)

Olympic Games

Singles: 1 (1 gold medal)

Year-end championships

Singles: 1 (0–1)

Masters 1000 tournaments

Singles: 5 (0–5)

Doubles: 11 (7–4)

ATP career finals

Singles: 46 (26 titles, 20 runner-ups)

Doubles: 41 (27–14)

Performance timelines

Singles

1Held in Stockholm till 1994, held as Stuttgart Masters from 1995 until 2001. Held as Madrid Masters from 2002 onwards.

Doubles

1Held in Stockholm till 1994, held as Stuttgart Masters from 1995 until 2001. Held as Madrid Masters from 2002 onwards.

Top 10 wins

Team titles
2002 – Davis Cup winner with Russia

2000, 2001, 2002 - World Team Cup finalist with Russia

Tennis records
 He played exclusively with and endorsed racquets from Austrian company Fischer throughout his career.
 One of eleven players to beat Roger Federer at Wimbledon (2000); the other ten being Jiří Novák (1999), Tim Henman (2001), Mario Ančić (2002), Rafael Nadal (2008), Tomáš Berdych (2010), Jo-Wilfried Tsonga (2011), Sergiy Stakhovsky (2013), Novak Djokovic (2014, 2015, 2019), Milos Raonic (2016) and Kevin Anderson (2018).
 In the episode of Sports Night "Shane", Dan and Jeremy spend over an hour recording and rerecording a ten-second commercial voiceover because Dan cannot say Yevgeny Kafelnikov.
 Kafelnikov is the only male player in the open era to have won two or more Grand Slam singles titles without also winning a Masters Series title, despite having reached five Masters Series finals.
 He won the Kremlin Cup in Moscow for a record five consecutive times from 1997 to 2001.

Other interests
 Kafelnikov is an avid supporter of Spartak Moscow FC.
 Kafelnikov is a professional golfer, he has won the Russian Amateur Open Championship of Golf in 2011. Note that this national tournament should not be confused with the Russian Open tournament that wasn't held that year.
 Kafelnikov starred in Virtua Tennis, an arcade tennis game.

Awards
1994–1999, 2001 The Russian Cup in the nomination Male Player of the Year
2000 The Russian Cup in the nomination Male Player of the Century
2002 The Russian Cup in the nomination Team of the Year (with M. Safin, M. Youzhny, S. Leonyuk, B. Sobkin, A. Cherkasov, V. Okhapkin, S. Yasnitsky, A. Glebov)

See also
Match fixing in tennis

References

External links

 
 
 

1974 births
Living people
Australian Open (tennis) champions
French Open champions
International Tennis Hall of Fame inductees
Olympic gold medalists for Russia
Olympic tennis players of Russia
Sportspeople from Sochi
Russian male tennis players
Tennis players at the 2000 Summer Olympics
Olympic medalists in tennis
Grand Slam (tennis) champions in men's singles
Grand Slam (tennis) champions in men's doubles
Medalists at the 2000 Summer Olympics
Match fixing in tennis
ATP number 1 ranked singles tennis players
Russian activists against the 2022 Russian invasion of Ukraine